Nadathara is a residential area situated in the City of Thrissur in Kerala state of India. Nadathara is Ward 22 of Thrissur Municipal Corporation.  India census, Nadathara had a population of 12,593. Males constitute 49% of the population and females 51%. Nadathara has an average literacy rate of 84%, higher than the national average of 59.5%: male literacy is 86%, and female literacy is 82%.

References

See also
Thrissur
Thrissur District

Suburbs of Thrissur city